The 1979–80 OMJHL season was the sixth season of the Ontario Major Junior Hockey League. The OMJHL inaugurates the Bobby Smith Trophy, named after Bobby Smith, awarded to the scholastic player of the year. Twelve teams each played 68 games. The Peterborough Petes won the J. Ross Robertson Cup, defeating the Windsor Spitfires.

Regular season

Final standings
Note: GP = Games played; W = Wins; L = Losses; T = Ties; GF = Goals for; GA = Goals against; PTS = Points; x = clinched playoff berth; y = clinched first round bye; z = clinched division title & first round bye

Leyden Division

Emms Division

Scoring leaders

Playoffs

Division quarter-finals

Leyden Division

(4) Kingston Canadians vs. (5) Sudbury Wolves

Emms Division

(4) Niagara Falls Flyers vs. (5) London Knights

Division semi-finals

Leyden Division

(1) Peterborough Petes vs. (5) Sudbury Wolves

(2) Ottawa 67's vs. (3) Oshawa Generals

Emms Division

(1) Windsor Spitfires vs. (4) Niagara Falls Flyers

(2)Toronto Marlboros vs. (3) Brantford Alexanders

Division finals

Leyden Division

(1) Peterborough Petes vs. (2) Ottawa 67's

Emms Division

(1) Windsor Spitfires vs. (3) Brantford Alexanders

J. Ross Robertson Cup

(L1) Peterborough Petes vs. (E1) Windsor Spitfires

Awards

See also
List of OHA Junior A standings
List of OHL seasons
1980 Memorial Cup
1980 NHL Entry Draft
1979 in sports
1980 in sports

References

HockeyDB

Ontario Hockey League seasons
OMJHL